Bufo bankorensis (vernacular names: Central Formosa toad, Bankor toad) is a species of toad in the family Bufonidae. There has been doubts about its separatedness from Bufo gargarizans from China and even other species, but it is currently considered a valid species.

Description
Bufo bankorensis is a large toad that can reach , even  in snout–vent length. Females are larger than males. The snout is short. Dorsolateral ridge is absent. The tympanum is not prominent. The parotoid glands are kidney-shaped. Skin is rough and covered with pointed tubercles of various size. Coloration is light brown color with orange, yellow, or black markings.

Habitat and conservation
Bufo bankorensis are found in a range of habitats at elevations up to : broadleaf forests, cultivated fields, mixed forests, and orchards. They can be seen foraging on insects under street lights during rainy nights. Breeding can take place in both streams and pools. One study found that a temperate population could breed throughout the year, while a subtropical population only bred during the cooler part of year, from September to March.

While Bufo bankorensis is a very common species, habitat loss remains a threat to it. It is also collected for food and traditional medicine.

References

bankorensis
Endemic fauna of Taiwan
Amphibians of Taiwan
Amphibians described in 1908
Taxa named by Thomas Barbour
Taxonomy articles created by Polbot